Sir Ian Wilmut, OBE FRS FMedSci FRSE (born 7 July 1944) is an English embryologist and Chair of the Scottish Centre for Regenerative Medicine at the University of Edinburgh. He is best known as the leader of the research group that in 1996 first cloned a mammal from an adult somatic cell, a Finnish Dorset lamb named Dolly. He was appointed OBE in 1999 for services to embryo development and knighted in the 2008 New Year Honours. He together with Keith Campbell and Shinya Yamanaka jointly received the 2008  Shaw Prize for Medicine and Life Sciences "for their works on the cell differentiation in mammals."

Early life and education
Wilmut was born in Hampton Lucy, Warwickshire, England. Wilmut's father, Leonard Wilmut, was a mathematics teacher who suffered from diabetes for fifty years, which eventually caused him to become blind. He was a student of the former Boys' High School, in Scarborough, where his father taught. Wilmut's early desire was to embark on a naval career, but he was unable to do so due to his colour blindness. As a school boy, Wilmut worked as a farm hand on weekends, which inspired him to study Agriculture at the University of Nottingham.

In 1966, Wilmut spent 8 weeks working in the laboratory of Christopher Polge, who is credited with developing the technique of cryopreservation in 1949. The following year Wilmut joined Polge's laboratory to undertake a Doctor of Philosophy degree at the University of Cambridge from which he graduated in 1971 with a thesis on semen cryopreservation. During this time he was a postgraduate student at Darwin College, Cambridge.

Career and research
Since his PhD, he has been involved in research focusing on gametes and embryogenesis, including working at the Roslin Institute.

Wilmut was the leader of the research group that in 1996 first cloned a mammal, a lamb named Dolly. Dolly died of a respiratory disease in 2003. However, in 2008 Wilmut announced that he would abandon the technique of somatic cell nuclear transfer by which Dolly was created in favour of an alternative technique developed by Shinya Yamanaka. This method has been used in mice to derive pluripotent stem cells from differentiated adult skin cells, thus circumventing the need to generate embryonic stem cells. Wilmut believes that this method holds greater potential for the treatment of degenerative conditions such as Parkinson's disease and to treat stroke and heart attack patients.

Wilmut led the team that created Dolly, but in 2006 admitted his colleague Keith Campbell deserved "66 per cent" of the invention that made Dolly's birth possible, and that the statement "I did not create Dolly" was accurate. His supervisory role is consistent with the post of principal investigator held by Wilmut at the time of Dolly's creation.

Wilmut is an Emeritus Professor at the Scottish Centre for Regenerative Medicine at the University of Edinburgh and in 2008 was knighted in the New Year Honours for services to science.

In 2006 his book After Dolly: The Uses and Misuses of Human Cloning was published, co-authored with Roger Highfield.

Awards and honours
In 1998 he received the Lord Lloyd of Kilgerran Award and the Golden Plate Award of the American Academy of Achievement. Wilmut was appointed Order of the British Empire (OBE) in 1999 and a Fellow of the Royal Society (FRS) in 2002. He is also an elected Fellow of the Academy of Medical Sciences in 1999 and Fellow of the Royal Society of Edinburgh. He was elected an EMBO Member in 2003.

In 1997 Wilmut was Time magazine man of the year runner up. He was knighted in the 2008 New Year Honours.

References

1944 births
Living people
People from Warwickshire
Alumni of the University of Nottingham
Cloning
Members of the European Molecular Biology Organization
English atheists
English inventors
English geneticists
Academics of the University of Edinburgh
Alumni of Darwin College, Cambridge
Fellows of the Royal Society
Fellows of the Academy of Medical Sciences (United Kingdom)
Fellows of the Royal Society of Edinburgh
Knights Bachelor
Officers of the Order of the British Empire
Foreign associates of the National Academy of Sciences
British embryologists
People educated at Scarborough High School for Boys